Andreas Ehrl (born 31 October 1965) is a German water polo player. He competed in the men's tournament at the 1988 Summer Olympics.

References

1965 births
Living people
German male water polo players
Olympic water polo players of West Germany
Water polo players at the 1988 Summer Olympics
Water polo players from Berlin